Potentilla aurea, the golden cinquefoil, is a species of flowering plant in the family Rosaceae. It is native to the mountains of mainland Europe, and has been introduced to Turkey. A number of cultivars are available, including 'Aurantiaca', 'Goldklumpen', and 'Plena'.

References

aurea
Flora of Spain
Flora of France
Flora of Central Europe
Flora of Southeastern Europe
Flora of Ukraine
Plants described in 1756
Taxa named by Carl Linnaeus